The following lists events that happened during 1968 in Laos.

Incumbents
Monarch: Savang Vatthana 
Prime Minister: Souvanna Phouma

Events

January
13 January - The Battle of Nam Bac ends in a Royal Laotian defeat. 
23 January - Battle of Ban Houei Sane

March
10-11 March - Battle of Lima Site 85

November
26 November - Operation Pigfat begins.

References

 
1960s in Laos
Years of the 20th century in Laos
Laos
Laos